Huberdeau is a village and municipality in the Laurentides region of Quebec, Canada, part of the Les Laurentides Regional County Municipality. It is located along the western banks of the Rouge River.

Demographics
Population trend:
 Population in 2011: 894 (2006 to 2011 population change: -3.2%)
 Population in 2006: 924
 Population in 2001: 918
 Population in 1996: 942
 Population in 1991: 903

Private dwellings occupied by usual residents: 409 (total dwellings: 531)

Mother tongue:
 English as first language: 6.4%
 French as first language: 89.5%
 English and French as first language: 1.2%
 Other as first language: 2.9%

Education

Sir Wilfrid Laurier School Board operates English-language schools:
 Arundel Elementary School in Arundel
 Sainte Agathe Academy (for high school only) in Sainte-Agathe-des-Monts

References

Incorporated places in Laurentides
Municipalities in Quebec